Timo Niemi (born 16 March 1966) is a Finnish wrestler. He competed at the 1988 Summer Olympics and the 1992 Summer Olympics.

References

External links
 

1966 births
Living people
Finnish male sport wrestlers
Olympic wrestlers of Finland
Wrestlers at the 1988 Summer Olympics
Wrestlers at the 1992 Summer Olympics
People from Kajaani
Sportspeople from Kainuu